Abathymermis parva is a species of nematode belonging to the family Mermithidae.

It is a freshwater species.

References

Nematodes